Sophie Angus (born 12 March 1999) is a Canadian swimmer. She competed in the women's 100 metre breaststroke event at the 2018 FINA World Swimming Championships (25 m), in Hangzhou, China.

Part of Canada's team for the 2022 Commonwealth Games in Birmingham, Angus swam the breaststroke leg in the heats of the 4×100 m mixed medley. She was replaced by James Dergousoff in the final, but received a silver medal after the team finished second there. She won a second silver as part of the women's 4×100 m medley team, again assigned the breastroke leg.

References

External links
 
 

1999 births
Living people
Canadian female swimmers
Canadian female breaststroke swimmers
Place of birth missing (living people)
Medalists at the 2019 Summer Universiade
Universiade medalists in swimming
Swimmers at the 2022 Commonwealth Games
Commonwealth Games medallists in swimming
Commonwealth Games silver medallists for Canada
Northwestern Wildcats women's swimmers
21st-century Canadian women
Universiade bronze medalists for Canada
Medallists at the 2022 Commonwealth Games